Oleg Kalashnikov (6 November 1962 – 15 April 2015) was a Ukrainian politician, born in Rivne, Ukrainian SSR. He was a member of the Party of Regions, Verkhovna Rada of Ukraine of V convocation. On 15 April 2015 he was shot to death at his home in Kyiv. On 16 April Ukrainian journalist Oles Buzina was shot to death in Kyiv as well.
A Ukrainian nationalist group calling itself Ukrainian Insurgent Army allegedly claimed responsibility for these and other murders in an email containing "grammatical mistakes not typical for a native Ukrainian speaker". The authenticity of the claim was questioned by the Ukrainian government as well as the very existence of the named group.

References

External links
 Personal website
 Гроші. Калашніков. До Києва підтягуються антимайданівці

1962 births
2015 deaths
Politicians from Rivne
Assassinated Ukrainian politicians
Deaths by firearm in Ukraine
Fifth convocation members of the Verkhovna Rada
Party of Regions politicians
People murdered in Ukraine
People of Anti-Maidan
Terrorist incidents in Ukraine
Political violence in Ukraine